A windsock (also called a wind cone or wind sleeve) is a conical textile tube that resembles a giant sock. It can be used as a basic indicator of wind speed and direction, or as decoration. They are typically used at airports to show the direction and strength of the wind to pilots, and at chemical plants where there is risk of gaseous leakage. They are also sometimes located alongside highways at windy locations.

At many airports, windsocks are externally or internally lit at night.

Function
Wind direction is the direction in which the windsock is pointing. (Wind directions are conventionally specified as the compass point from which the wind originates; so a windsock pointing due north indicates a southerly wind). Wind speed is indicated by the windsock's angle relative to the mounting pole; in low winds it droops; in high winds it flies horizontally.

Alternating stripes of high visibility orange and white were initially used to help to estimate wind speed, with each stripe adding 3 knots to the estimated speed. However, some circular frame mountings cause windsocks to be held open at one end, indicating a velocity of 3 knots even when it is not present.

Standards

Per Transport Canada standards, a  wind fully extends the windsock; a  wind raises it to 5° below the horizontal; and a  wind raises it to 30° below the horizontal.

ICAO standards specify a truncated cone-shaped windsock at least 3.6 m long and 0.9 m in diameter at the large end. It should be visible and understandable from an altitude of 300 m and ideally be of a single colour. If it is necessary to use two colours, they should ideally be orange and white arranged in five alternating bands, with the first and last darker in tone.

See also
Air sock
Anemometer – meteorological device for measuring wind speed and direction
Draco (military standard) - military standard carried by the Roman cavalry.
Koinobori – Japanese decorative carp-shaped windsocks

References 

Airport infrastructure
Meteorological instrumentation and equipment
Socks